Hørður Heðinsson Askham (born 22 September 1994) is a Faroese footballer who plays as a midfielder for HB and the Faroe Islands national team.

Career
Askham made his international debut for Faroe Islands on 5 September 2019 in a UEFA Euro 2020 qualifying match against Sweden, which finished as a 0–4 home loss.

Career statistics

International

References

External links
 
 
 

1994 births
Living people
Faroese footballers
Faroe Islands youth international footballers
Faroe Islands under-21 international footballers
Faroe Islands international footballers
Association football midfielders
B36 Tórshavn players
KÍ Klaksvík players
Havnar Bóltfelag players
Faroe Islands Premier League players